Nawabganj is a locality in North Barrackpur Municipality of North 24 Parganas district in the Indian state of West Bengal. It is a part of the area covered by Kolkata Metropolitan Development Authority (KMDA). The locality is situated beside the Hooghly River and is surrounded by Palta Water Works, Barrackpore Air Force Station and Rifle Factory Ishapore.

Geography

References 

Cities and towns in North 24 Parganas district
Neighbourhoods in North 24 Parganas district
Neighbourhoods in Kolkata
Kolkata Metropolitan Area